Damocles was a legendary Greek figure.

Damocles may also refer to:
 5335 Damocles, an asteroid
 Damocles (video game), a 1990 science fiction videogame
 Oroxylum indicum, a flowering plant also known as the "tree of Damocles"
 Damocles (targeting pod), a French laser designator and forward looking infrared pod used on military aircraft
 The Damocles Gulf Crusade, a major conflict in the Warhammer 40,000 tabletop miniature wargame
 Damocles serratus, a species of prehistoric shark

See also
 Sword of Damocles (disambiguation)